The Roman Catholic Diocese of Bouar is a diocese in Bouar in the Ecclesiastical province of Bangui in the Central African Republic.

History
 February 27, 1978: Established as Diocese of Bouar from the Diocese of Berbérati

Leadership
 Bishops of Bouar (Roman rite)
 Bishop Armando Umberto Gianni, O.F.M. Cap. (February 27, 1978 - December 2, 2017)
 Bishop Mirosław Gucwa from Poland (since February 11, 2018)

See also
Roman Catholicism in the Central African Republic

Sources
 GCatholic.org
 catholic-hierarchy.org

Roman Catholic dioceses in the Central African Republic
Roman Catholic Ecclesiastical Province of Bangui
Christian organizations established in 1978
Roman Catholic dioceses and prelatures established in the 20th century
Nana-Mambéré